Wale Adenuga  (born 24 September 1950) is a Nigerian former cartoonist/publisher, and currently series producer, best known for the publications Ikebe Super, Binta and friends and Super Story, and their televised versions through his production company Wale Adenuga Production (WAP).

Early life
The son of a tobacco merchant, Adenuga was raised in Ibadan and attended the Ibadan City Academy where he obtained his O-Level certificate, before proceeding to King's College, Lagos for his higher school certificate where he formed a pop band which was later disbanded.

Publishing
Adenuga studied Business Administration at the University of Lagos in 1971, and worked for the cartoon section of the Campus' Magazine where he was soon made Chief Cartoonist. In 1975, after graduation and youth service in Bendel, his comic Ikebe Super was launched,  introducing several iconic characters including womaniser Papa Ajasco, illiterate Pa Jimoh, and playboy Boy Alinco. A leading female character, promiscuous gold-digger Miss Pepeiye, was later introduced. Adenuga's other magazines were Super Story, which focused on satirical issues and Binta, a children's publication.

Film/Television Production
In the late eighties, Nigerian publications were affected by the economic depression, leaving Adenuga with the decision to move from print to electronic media. Before the growth of the film industry, Adenuga had released the celluloid movie Papa Ajasco, which was based on the main character in Ikebe Super, in 1983. Papa Ajasco made history as the first English comedy in an industry which had been dominated by Yoruba productions. A film version of Binta, re-entitled Binta My Daughter was released in 1995. A year later the television series Papa Ajasco (formerly The Ajasco Family) was aired on Nigerian television to rave reviews. This small screen version saw the return of the old characters, and new character Pa James, who was created to avoid offending muslims. ("We did not want [a muslim] who did the silly things as Pa Jimoh alone.")

Institutions
On 24 September 1994, Adenuga and his wife Ehiwenma founded Binta International School in Lagos, a foundation dedicated to better education in Nigeria;

In 2004, Adenuga opened the Pencil Film and Television Institute (PEFTI). Its courses include Producing, Directing, and Cinematography. The school was recently featured in De Film Industries van Nigeria, a Danish documentary on the Nigerian film industry.

Awards
 5 awards at the Nigeria Film Festival, 2002: Best Producer, Best Script Writer, Best Director, Best Television Drama and Best Socially Relevant Television Production.
 Member of the Order of the Federal Republic (MFR), 2009

Personal life
Adenuga has been married to Ehiwenma since 1975.

See also
 List of Nigerian film producers

References

1950 births
Living people
University of Lagos alumni
Yoruba filmmakers
King's College, Lagos alumni
Nigerian film producers
Nigerian film directors
Members of the Order of the Federal Republic
People from Ife
People from Ibadan
Filmmakers from Lagos
Founders of Nigerian schools and colleges
Nigerian cartoonists
Nigerian publishers (people)